In dynamical systems theory, the Olech theorem establishes sufficient conditions for global asymptotic stability of a two-equation system of non-linear differential equations. The result was established by Czesław Olech in 1963, based on joint work with Philip Hartman.

Theorem 
(a) the trace of the Jacobian matrix is negative,  for all ,
(b) the Jacobian determinant is positive,  for all , and
(c) the system is coupled everywhere with either

References 

Theorems in dynamical systems
Stability theory